Gunnel Vallquist (19 June 1918 – 11 January 2016) was a Swedish writer and translator. Born in Stockholm, Vallquist was elected a member of the Swedish Academy in 1982. Vallquist was a member of the Catholic Church and wrote several essays on Catholic religion in contemporary times, among them reports from the Second Vatican Council. She translated the seven-piece novel In Search of Lost Time by Marcel Proust into Swedish (1965–1982).

Bibliography
 Något att leva för (1956)
 Giorgio La Pira : borgmästare och profet (1957)
 Ett bländande mörker (1958)
 Till dess dagen gryr : anteckningar 1950–1958 (1959)
 Vägar till Gud (1960)
 Den oförstådda kärleken (1961)
 Helgonens svar (1963)
 Dagbok från Rom. D. 1, Journalistminnen från Vatikankonciliet (1964)
 Dagbok från Rom. D. 2, Reformation i Vatikanen? (1964)
 Dagbok från Rom. D. 3, Kyrkligt, världsligt, kvinnligt (1965)
 Dagbok från Rom. D. 4, Uppbrott (1966)
 Kyrkor i uppbrott (1968)
 Interkommunion? : synpunkter på en kristen livsfråga (1969)
 Följeslagare (1975)
 Morgon och afton (1976)
 Sökare och siare : essayer (1982)
 Anders Österling : inträdestal i Svenska akademien (1982)
 Steg på vägen (1983)
 Notiser om Franska akademien (1985)
 Helena Nyblom (1987)
 Den romerske kuries metoder (1993)
 Katolska läroår : Uppsala-Paris-Rom (1995)
 Vad väntar vi egentligen på? : texter om kristen enhet 1968–2002
 Guds ord till människorna : skrift och tradition enligt Dei Verbum (2007); co-authors: Rainer Carls & Birger Olsson
 Texter i urval (2008)
 Herre, låt mig få brinna : anteckningar 1950–1958 (2009)

References

Further reading 
 

1918 births
2016 deaths
Writers from Stockholm
Swedish Roman Catholics
Converts to Roman Catholicism from Lutheranism
Members of the Swedish Academy
Swedish women writers
Swedish translators
Translators from French
Translators to Swedish
Litteris et Artibus recipients
20th-century translators